Krzysztof Chodkiewicz or  Katkevičius (died 1652) was a Polish–Lithuanian nobleman (szlachcic).

History
Chodkiewicz  held the title of Great Standard Bearer of Lithuania. In 1610, he was named Master of the Horse of Lithuania. In 1623, Castellan of Trakai, and in 1633, Castellan of Vilnius, in 1636, Voivode of Vilnius Voivodeship. Finally in 1642,  he became Starost (Grodzki) of Babruysk, Kreva and held the deeds to Biala and Wiszniewo.

During the Polish–Swedish War, he participated in the siege of Pärnu, which started on February 28, 1601, under the command of his cousin, Jan Karol Chodkiewicz.

He also took part in the Polish–Muscovite War, as a pułkownik (colonel) of the Lisowczyk regiment until March 28, 1617. In 1616, a regiment under his command captured and burned Kursk and several smaller cities. He was also a participant in the Battle of Bołchow.

See also
Chodkiewicz family
Lithuanian nobility

External links
Description of Lisowczyk formation and Krzysztof commanding 
List of Polish battles 

16th-century births
1652 deaths
Krzysztof Chodkiewicz
Counts of Poland
Voivode of Vilnius